Jianchangnathus is an extinct genus of basal pterosaur from the Middle Jurassic Tiaojishan Formation of northeastern China.

Naming
Jianchangnathus was first described and named by Cheng Xin, Wang Xiaolin, Jiang Shunxing and Alexander W.A. Kellner in 2012 and the type species is Jianchangnathus robustus. The generic name combines a reference to Jianchang County with a Greek γνάθος, gnathos, "jaw". The specific name means "robust" in Latin.

Jianchangnathus is known from a single fossil skeleton, holotype IVPP V16866, recovered near Linglongta, in Jianchang County.

Description
Autapomorphies of Jiangchangnathus include: a convex top margin of the lower jaw; a large front branch of the jugal; and the first three pairs of teeth of the lower jaws pointing strongly forwards. Its describers found it to share several features with Scaphognathus, including a high front end of the lower jaws, a pear-shaped lower temporal fenestra with the broad end below and teeth in the maxilla of the upper jaw that have a space equal to that of three toothsockets between them. Additionally, undescribed fossils of a pterosaur referred to Jianchangnathus suggest that the color of its pycnofibers was brown.

Phylogeny
Jianchangnathus was assigned by the describers to the Scaphognathidae.

See also
 List of pterosaur genera
 Timeline of pterosaur research

References

Middle Jurassic pterosaurs of Asia
Rhamphorhynchids
Fossil taxa described in 2012
Fossils of China